Tarpenning may refer to:
Kory Tarpenning (born 1962), American pole vaulter 
Marc Tarpenning (born 1964), American engineer and entrepreneur